Riders on the Storm is the sixth studio album by the German heavy metal band Die Apokalyptischen Reiter, released by Nuclear Blast Records on 25 August 2006. It peaked at #31 in the German Media Control Charts.

Track listing
  "Friede Sei Mit Dir"  – 2:56
  "Riders on the Storm"  – 3:47
  "Seemann"  – 2:55
  "Der Adler"  – 2:50
  "Revolution"  – 4:26
  "Wenn Ich Träume"  – 3:08
  "Soldaten Dieser Erde"  – 3:28
  "In the Land of White Horses"  – 2:27
  "Liebe"  – 4:19
  "Schenk Mir Heut Nacht"  – 3:01
  "Himmelskind"  – 3:33
  "Feuer"  – 3:27
  "Mmmh"  – 5:00
  "Peace May Be with You"  – 2:59

References

Die Apokalyptischen Reiter albums
2006 albums